Usuthu-Tembe-Futi Transfrontier Conservation Area is a group of protected areas in southern Africa, straddling parts of South Africa, Mozambique and Eswatini, including the following:

 Maputo Special Reserve (Mozambique).
 The Futi Corridor (Mozambique).
 Usuthu Gorge Conservancy (Eswatini).
Tshanini Community Conservation Areas.
 Usuthu Gorge Community Conservation Areas.
 Ndumo Game Reserve (South Africa).
 Tembe Elephant Park (South Africa).
 Community Area left of the Thembe Elephant Park.
 Community Area right of the Thembe Elephant Park.

Future plans
This park once it proved itself is to become part of the Greater Lubombo Transfrontier Conservation Area.

Protected areas of South Africa
Protected areas of Eswatini
Protected areas of Mozambique
Elephants
Transboundary protected areas